Hexaplatarthus vadoni is a species of beetle in the family Carabidae, the only species in the genus Hexaplatarthus.

References

Paussinae